The following is a list of transfers and squad changes for the 2020–21 Indian Super League season. The list includes both pre-season and mid-season transfers.

Transfers
All clubs without a flag are or were members of the Indian Super League.

See also 

 Indian Super League
 2020–21 Indian Super League season

References

Lists of Indian Super League transfers
2020–21 in Indian football
India
2020–21 Indian Super League season